YSR Pension Kanuka is a scheme launched by the government of Andhra Pradesh for the welfare and development of senior citizens, disabled people and transgenders by granting a monthly pension.

Development 
The scheme was brought into effect by Chief minister of Andhra Pradesh, Y. S. Jagan Mohan Reddy in June 2019, payable to beneficiaries from 1 July 2019, which was door delivered by village volunteers. The second instalment of funds were released on 1 March 2020 where 87.5% of beneficiaries received the amount on day 1. The pension was also credited into the accounts of beneficiaries during the COVID-19 pandemic in India

Scheme 
YSR Pension Kanuka is a welfare program launched by the government of Andhra Pradesh where the earlier age criteria of 65 years has been revised to 60 years and the pension amount has been increased to ₹2,250 from ₹2,000. Whereas the pension amount of ₹3,000 rupees is credited into the beneficiary disabled persons, transgenders and  artists. People suffering from chronic kidney diseases undergoing dialyses in both government and private hospitals are supported with the pension amount of ₹10,000. This was majorly done to help the victims of Uddanam nephropathy.

References 

2019 establishments in Andhra Pradesh
Government welfare schemes in Andhra Pradesh